Redgate is a rural locality in the South Burnett Region, Queensland, Australia. In the  Redgate had a population of 71 people.

History 
Redgate was formerly known as North Barambah.

Redgate Provisional School opened on 15 October 1908. On 1 January 1909 it became Redgate State School. It closed on 31 December 1973.

In the  Redgate had a population of 71 people.

A community hall existed in Redgate for many years, although it has since been removed on an unknown date.  The hall was mentioned in the Brisbane Courier newspaper on 23 August 1924 when it was reported – "A meeting of the committee of the Redgate Hall was held last week, when the following committee was elected: Messrs. E. Horton. G.Young, A. Sippel, W. Goschnick. W. Notts, and C. Bischioff."

References 

South Burnett Region
Localities in Queensland